Vosburgh is a surname. Notable people with the surname include:

Alfred D. Vosburgh (1890-1958), American actor better known as Gayne Whitman
Dick Vosburgh (1929–2007), American comedy writer and lyricist
Tilly Vosburgh (born 1960), English actress
George Vosburgh, American trumpet player

See also
Vosburgh Stakes, American thoroughbred horse race